Aleksandar Šćekić (born 12 December 1991) is a Montenegrin professional footballer who plays as a defensive midfielder for Hapoel Haifa and Montenegro national team.

Club career

Berane
Šćekić made his senior debut at his hometown club Berane in the 2009–10 Montenegrin First League, as the team suffered relegation to the Second League. He was subsequently loaned to Lovćen, continuing to play in the top flight, before returning to Berane in the second half of the 2010–11 Montenegrin Second League and helping them earn promotion back to the First League via playoffs. However, they were immediately relegated back to the second tier. He was then loaned out to Jedinstvo Bijelo Polje, spending there the first half of the 2012–13 Montenegrin First League, before rejoining Berane until the end of the 2012–13 Montenegrin Second League.

Bokelj
In the summer of 2013, Šćekić joined fellow Second League club Bokelj and instantly helped them win the championship and promotion to the First League. He played regularly in the top flight over the next two seasons, earning himself a call-up to the national team.

Gençlerbirliği
In June 2016, Šćekić moved abroad and signed with Turkish club Gençlerbirliği on a three-year deal. He scored two times in 24 games during the 2017–18 Süper Lig, once in a 2–1 home win over Beşiktaş and once in a 5–1 away loss against Galatasaray.

Partizan
On 21 August 2018, Šćekić signed a three-year contract with Serbian club Partizan, being handed the number 19 shirt. He made his debut for the team two days later, coming on as a substitute for compatriot Nebojša Kosović in a 1–1 home draw with Beşiktaş. On 5 May 2019, Šćekić scored his first goal for Partizan, giving his team a 2–1 win over Napredak Kruševac. He made 28 appearances across all competitions in his first season with the Crno-beli, helping them win the Serbian Cup.

On 25 July 2019, Šćekić netted his first goal of the season to give Partizan a 1–0 win over Welsh club Connah's Quay Nomads in the first leg of the Europa League second qualifying round. He made a career-high 38 appearances during the 2019–20 campaign, scoring three goals.

In January 2021, Šćekić extended his contract with Partizan until 2023. He made 40 appearances and scored five goals in the 2020–21 season, both career highs, but the club ended without a trophy for the second year in a row.

Zagłębie Lubin
On 23 January 2022, Šćekić moved to Poland and signed a one-and-a-half-year contract with Ekstraklasa side Zagłębie Lubin. On 1 June 2022, his contract was terminated by mutual consent, with Šćekić wishing to be closer to his family in Montenegro cited as one of the reasons.

International career
Šćekić was capped for Montenegro at under-17, under-19 and under-21 levels. He made his full international debut for Montenegro under Ljubiša Tumbaković, playing the first 85 minutes of a 2–1 friendly loss against Greece on 24 March 2016.

Career statistics

Club

International

Honours
Bokelj
 Montenegrin Second League: 2013–14
Partizan
 Serbian Cup: 2018–19

References

External links

 
 
 
 
 

1991 births
Living people
People from Berane
Montenegrin footballers
Association football midfielders
Montenegro youth international footballers
Montenegro under-21 international footballers
Montenegro international footballers
FK Berane players
FK Lovćen players
FK Jedinstvo Bijelo Polje players
FK Bokelj players
Gençlerbirliği S.K. footballers
FK Partizan players
Zagłębie Lubin players
Dibba FC players
Hapoel Haifa F.C. players
Montenegrin First League players
Montenegrin Second League players
Süper Lig players
Serbian SuperLiga players
Ekstraklasa players
UAE Pro League players
Israeli Premier League players
Montenegrin expatriate footballers
Expatriate footballers in Turkey
Expatriate footballers in Serbia
Expatriate footballers in Poland
Expatriate footballers in the United Arab Emirates
Expatriate footballers in Israel
Montenegrin expatriate sportspeople in Turkey
Montenegrin expatriate sportspeople in Serbia
Montenegrin expatriate sportspeople in Poland
Montenegrin expatriate sportspeople in the United Arab Emirates
Montenegrin expatriate sportspeople in Israel